Gabriela "Gabi" Zingre-Graf (born 5 August 1970 in Gstaad) is a former Swiss alpine skier who competed in the 1994 Winter Olympics.

References

External links
 

1970 births
Living people
Swiss female alpine skiers
Olympic alpine skiers of Switzerland
Alpine skiers at the 1994 Winter Olympics
People from Gstaad
Sportspeople from the canton of Bern
20th-century Swiss women